Krupki District is a second-level administrative subdivision (raion) of Minsk Region, Belarus. Its capital is the town of Krupki. Also located in the district are the small towns of Bobr and Chalopieničy.

The largest lake of the district is Lake Syalyava (fourteenth largest in Belarus).

Notable residents 
 Uladzimer Kavalonak (also known as Vladimir Kovalyonok) (1942, Belaje village), Soviet Belarusian cosmonaut
 Ales Pushkin (b. August 6, 1965, Bobr village), Belarusian non-conformist painter, theater artist, performer, art curator, and political prisoner

References

 
Districts of Minsk Region